Isabelle Stadden (born July 9, 2002) is an American swimmer. She won the silver medal in the women's 200 metre backstroke event at the 2019 Pan American Games held in Lima, Peru. She also won the gold medal in the women's 4 × 100 metre medley relay event.

At the 2018 USA Swimming Championships held in Irvine, California, she won the bronze medal in the women's 200 metre backstroke event. The following month, she won the gold medal in the 200 meter backstroke as a 16-year-old at the 2018 Junior Pan Pacific Swimming Championships in Suva, Fiji, with a time of 2:09.52.

References

External links 
 
 Isabelle Stadden at the 2019 Pan American Games
 

2002 births
Living people
Sportspeople from Decatur, Illinois
American female backstroke swimmers
Pan American Games gold medalists for the United States
Pan American Games silver medalists for the United States
Pan American Games medalists in swimming
Swimmers at the 2019 Pan American Games
Medalists at the 2019 Pan American Games
California Golden Bears women's swimmers
Medalists at the FINA World Swimming Championships (25 m)
21st-century American women